Quikkit was a manufacturer of kitplanes located in Dallas, Texas. The firm was founded in 1992 by Tom Scott to market the Glass Goose amphibious aircraft, a substantially revised version of the Aero Composites Sea Hawker design that Scott purchased the rights to after the previous manufacturer ceased business.

References

Defunct aircraft manufacturers of the United States
Companies based in Dallas